Jacob Hilditch (20 January 1864 – 1 June 1930) was a Norwegian writer. His literary debut was the short story collection Under norsk Flag from 1889. He is particularly known for the three volumes of Trangvikposten, 1900 to 1907. He was a co-founder of the Norwegian Authors' Union, and leader for two periods, from 1896 to 1900, and from 1908 to 1910.

References

1864 births
1930 deaths
Writers from Oslo
Norwegian male writers